The following highways are numbered 821:

Canada
Alberta Highway 821

United Kingdom
 A821 road

United States